Indian Institute of Science Education and Research, Pune (IISER Pune) is an autonomous public university established in 2006. It is one of the seven Indian Institutes of Science Education and Research, and was one of the first IISERs to be established along with IISER Kolkata. It is located in the city of Pune, India.

Campus

The construction of the final campus was completed in 2012.  The campus is of 98 acres.

Academics

Academic programmes 
IISER Pune offers integrated masters programmes (BS-MS), an integrated doctoral programme (Int. PhD) and a doctoral programme (PhD).

Admission to the master's degree is through the IISER joint admission process which provides three channels for admission: Kishore Vaigyanik Protsahan Yojana, Joint Entrance Examination – Advanced and state and central boards candidates, which require an additional IISER Aptitude Test. Admission to the various PhD programmes is either with a master's degree in science or with a bachelor's degree, for the integrated PhD programme. Candidates are screened by interviews. In addition to that candidates should have qualified a national level entrance exam for PhD program in science (like GATE)

The faculty is organised by various disciplines such as Biology, Chemistry, Earth and Climate Sciences, Humanities and Social Sciences, Mathematics, and Physics. Interdisciplinary research is encouraged across disciplines. The first batch of students graduated in 2012.

Rankings

In the 2020 Times Higher Education World University Rankings, IISER Pune is ranked among the top 800 globally and ranked 10 in India.

Research centres
IISER-Pune houses the following advanced research centres/ centres of excellence:
Centre for Integrative Studies (CIS)
DBT Centre of Excellence in Epigenetics
DST Unit on Nanoscience
Max-Planck Partner Group in Quantum Field Theory
Max-Planck Partner Group in Glyco-nanotechnology
National facility for gene function in Health and Disease
Centre of Excellence in Science and Mathematics Education (CoESME)
Centre for Energy Science

Student life
The majority of the student activities at IISER-P are conducted by various clubs.

Mimamsa is an intercollegiate science challenge conducted by the students of IISER-P. The aim of the organizers is to make it the most conceptually challenging competition at the national level for science students. It is a two-stage affair. The first stage is a written exam with 60 subjective questions from all disciplines of science. The top four colleges selected through this round move into the finals.

There is also a very active SPIC MACAY sub-chapter, which organizes events jointly with National Chemical Laboratory, and the SPIC MACAY Pune Chapter.

In the last week of October or first week of November, IISER Pune organises its college fest, Karavaan. The fest attracts students from colleges all across Pune, as well as national institutes all over India.

See also
 List of universities in India
 List of autonomous higher education institutes in India

References

External links
IISER Pune

Universities and colleges in Pune
Research institutes in Pune
Pune, Indian Institute of Science Education and Research
Research institutes established in 2006
2006 establishments in Maharashtra
Academic staff of the Indian Institute of Science Education and Research, Pune